Stereo MC's are an English hip hop/electronic dance group that formed in Nottingham, England, in 1985. They had an international top 20 hit with their single "Connected". After releasing eight albums for Island Records, K7, Graffiti Recordings, and Pias, they formed the label Connected with Terranova to release their own material and that of other artists within the house/techno/electronic medium.

Career

Vocalist Rob Birch and disc jockey (DJ)/producer Nick Hallam founded their Gee Street recording studio and record label with money they were given to leave their London flat and, dispensing with using a backing band, travelled to early gigs on public transport.

As Birch & Hallam they recorded two synth-pop singles in 1983: "What You Say" and "Pray For Me", both released on the A&M label.

When Gee Street attracted the attention of 4th & Broadway, they recorded the debut Stereo MCs' album, 33-45-78 (1989), on a shoestring budget with DJ Cesare, drummer Owen If and backing vocalist Cath Coffey. In 1990, "Elevate My Mind" was the first British hip hop single to reach the United States R&B record chart. Having supported the Happy Mondays on a US tour, in the emerging UK alternative dance scene, it took an alliance with the Jungle Brothers to ensure chart success for Supernatural (1990). Remix work for U2 and Queen Latifah followed.

Their live band included singers Andrea Bedassie and Verona Davis, and they were one of the few hip hop outfits to play at rock music festivals at the time. 1992's mainstream breakthrough Connected, a UK Albums Chart #2, contained the hit singles "Connected", "Step It Up", "Creation", and "Ground Level", and won them BRIT Awards for Best Group and Best Album. Hallam and Birch then created the music-publishing firm Spirit Songs, which signed Finley Quaye.

However, the follow-up to Connected did not appear for almost a decade. Further remix duties for Madonna ("Frozen") and the Jungle Brothers ("Jungle Brother") in 1998 kept the Stereo MCs' name in the limelight. Madonna went on to use the "Frozen" remix on her 2001 Drowned World Tour.

In 2000, they released a Disc Jockey mix for Studio !K7's DJ-Kicks series and remixed another song for Madonna ("Music"). The following year saw the release of Deep Down & Dirty, followed by a tour including slots opening for the recently re-united Jane's Addiction.

Their sixth studio album, Double Bubble, was released in July 2008, followed by their seventh, Emperor's Nightingale, in August 2011. In December 2008, they supported Madness at the O2 Arena in London.

Drummer Owen If died on July 10, 2022, at the age of 63.

Members
 'The Head' – born Nick Hallam,  11 June 1960,  Nottingham, England.
 'Rob B' – born Robert Charles Birch, 11 June 1961, Ruddington, Nottinghamshire, England.
 'Owen If' – born Ian Frederick Rossiter, 20 March 1959 - died 10 July 2022, Newport, Monmouthshire, Wales.
 'Aina Roxx' 
 'Cath Coffey'.

Discography

EPs
The Stereo MCs (1990) 

This EP was written, produced and composed by the Stereo MC's and released on Island Records. The songs were a compilation of their first three singles, and would later appear on their first album.

Studio albums
33-45-78 (1989)
Supernatural (1990)
Connected (1992) #2 UK, #86 AUS
Deep Down & Dirty (2001) #17 UK, #58 AUS
Paradise (2005)
Double Bubble (2008)
Emperor's Nightingale (2011)

Compilation albums
Retroactive (2002) 
Live at the BBC (2008)

Other albums
DJ-Kicks: Stereo MCs (2000) (Remix album of other artists)

Singles

See also
List of number-one dance hits (United States)
List of artists who reached number one on the US Dance chart

References

External links
Official website
Britishhiphop.co.uk – The original UK Hip Hop history
Stereo Mc's Mixtape for The New Worck
Stereo Mc's Interview Themselves

English hip hop groups
Musical groups from Nottingham
English electronic music groups
English house music groups
Hip house music groups
Gee Street Records artists
Musical groups established in 1985
Brit Award winners
1985 establishments in England